The Prudential Trophy was the name used for One Day International cricket tournaments held in England from 1972 until 1982. During this time, Prudential also sponsored the World Cup tournaments in 1975, 1979 and 1983.

Depending on the number of teams touring England in a given season, there would typically be either one or two series each year, involving the home side and each visiting side.

Series by year

Successor series
Texaco Trophy
Emirates Triangular (1998)
NatWest Series (2000–present)

One Day International cricket competitions
International cricket competitions in England
Prudential plc